Ipiranga may also refer to:

Places

São Paulo 
 Ipiranga Brook, a Brazilian brook in the vicinity of São Paulo, from which the borough of Ipiranga derives its name
 Subprefecture of Ipiranga, São Paulo
 Ipiranga (district of São Paulo)
 Museu Paulista, popularly known as Museu do Ipiranga

Paraná 
 Ipiranga, Paraná, a city in the Paraná state of Brazil
 Ipiranga River (Paraná)
 the Ipiranga meteorite of 1972, which fell in Paraná, Brazil (see meteorite falls)

Elsewhere in Brazil 
 Ipiranga de Goiás, a municipality in Goiás
 Ipiranga do Sul, a municipality in Rio Grande do Sul
 Ipiranga do Piauí, a municipality in Piauí
 Ipiranga do Norte, a municipality in Mato Grosso
 Ipiranga Airport, an airport in Santo Antônio do Içá, Amazonas

Other 
 The Cry of Ipiranga, the declaration of independence of Brazil by Prince Pedro in São Paulo on 7 September 1822
 Petróleo Ipiranga, a Brazilian conglomerate involved in the refining and distribution of oil

See also 
 Ipiranga River (disambiguation)